Sven Nyhus (born 21 May 1932) is a Norwegian folk musician, fiddler, composer and musicologist. He was born in Røros; the son of construction worker and fiddler Peder Nyhus, and the father of Harding fiddler Åshild Breie Nyhus and pianist Ingfrid Breie Nyhus. Among his collections are Pols i Røros-tradisjon from 1973 and Felklang på Rørosmål from 1983. Among his albums are Bergrosa from 1984 and Grimen from 1997. He was appointed professor at the Norwegian Academy of Music from 1989 to 2002. He was awarded the Spellemannprisen honorary prize in 2000, and was decorated Commander of the Order of St. Olav in 2002.

References

1932 births
Living people
People from Røros
Norwegian musicians
Heilo Music artists